Adam Alexi-Malle is an Italian actor, singer, dancer and musician.

Life and career
Alexi-Malle was born in Siena, Italy. His father is from Italy (Sardinian) and his mother is Palestinian-Spanish. They emigrated to London, England first, and later to the United States.

As musician, he began performing at the age of 9, intent on a career as a concert pianist and violinist having trained with Dorothy DeLay and Raphael Bronstein and at the Conservatoire de Paris, the Moscow Conservatory, the Juilliard School and the American Ballet Theatre. In the early 1990s, following a course at the Royal Academy of Dramatic Arts in London, he began his acting career.

He has appeared in such films as Bowfinger, The Man Who Wasn't There, Hidalgo, Celebrity and Failure To Launch and on television in numerous guest-starring roles including The Sopranos, The West Wing, Alias and 24, and on stage in the Tony Award-winning/nominated Broadway productions of Titanic and The Threepenny Opera. He starred opposite Sam Rockwell and Cara Seymour in the critically acclaimed Off-Broadway premiere of Mike Leigh's Goose-Pimples with The New Group theatre in New York City garnering nominations as Outstanding Featured Actor with both the Drama Desk and Outer Critics Circle Awards.

Alexi-Malle has stated that he is fluent in Italian, French, Spanish, Russian and Arabic. He has additionally worked as a voice artist for Late Night with David Letterman, Family Guy and has done voice-overs in video games such as The Bourne Conspiracy, Diablo 3 and Assassin's Creed: Revelations. He is a staff audiobook narrator for Penguin Random House Audio having voiced numerous titles including, "The Second Empress", "Letters from Skye", "The Anatomy Lesson", "I Will Never See The World Again", "White Bird - A Wonder Story", and "POV - Point of View". 

Alexi-Malle is the founding owner and CEO of the multimedia production company JP²A²M:worldwide Entertainment Group which includes the subsidiary production entities, Siena Films and virtuosoTV as well as the theatre company, Blistering Muses.

Filmography

Film

Television

Video games

Theatre
 Goose-Pimples
 Titanic
 Sakharam Binder
 Terrorism
 The Three Sisters
 The Threepenny Opera

Discography
 Titanic (musical) – Original Cast Album (Varèse Sarabande)
 Nellie McKay: Normal as Blueberry Pie – A Tribute to Doris Day (credited as Paolo Perre) (Verve)
 Love Song'' – The Kinsey Scale (band) featuring Paolo Perre (Autonomous Records UK)

Awards and nominations
 Legacy Poetry Prize – 2014 –  Book – Poetry, "A Confederacy of Joy" by the Siena Press under birth name, Juan-Paolo Perre
 Tony Awards – Original Broadway Cast : Titanic (musical) – Best Musical, Best Original Score, Best Book of a Musical, Best Orchestrations, Best Scenic Design
 Drama Desk Award – Outstanding Featured Actor in a Play for "Goose-Pimples" – The New Group – 1998
 Outer Critics Circle Award – Outstanding Featured Actor in a Play for "Goose-Pimples" – 1998

References

External links
 

1964 births
Living people
Italian male singers
Italian male television actors
Italian male film actors
Italian male voice actors
Italian male video game actors
British male film actors
British male voice actors
British male video game actors
People from Siena
Italian people of Spanish descent
Italian people of Sardinian descent
Italian people of Palestinian descent
American male actors
People of Tuscan descent